Windows DNA, short for Windows Distributed interNet Applications Architecture, is a marketing name for a collection of Microsoft technologies that enable the Windows platform and the Internet to work together. Some of the principal technologies that DNA comprises are ActiveX, Dynamic HTML (DHTML) and COM. Windows DNA has been largely superseded by the Microsoft .NET Framework, and Microsoft no longer uses the term. To support web-based applications, Microsoft has tried to add Internet features into the operating system using COM. However, developing a web-based application using COM-based Windows DNA is quite complex, because Windows DNA requires the use of numerous technologies and languages.
These technologies are completely unrelated from a syntactic point of view.

External links
 Unraveling Windows DNA at MSDN
 Windows DNA at Smart Computing Encyclopedia
 Microsoft's DNA Web page in 1999

Windows communication and services